The Morocco Tennis Tour – Kenitra is a professional tennis tournament played on outdoor red clay courts. It is currently part of the Association of Tennis Professionals (ATP) Challenger Tour. It is held annually in Kenitra, Morocco, since 2013.

Past finals

Singles

Doubles

External links
Official website

 
ATP Challenger Tour
Clay court tennis tournaments
Tennis tournaments in Morocco
Sport in Kenitra
Recurring sporting events established in 2008